Claude Lombard (25 February 1945 – 20 September 2021) was a Belgian singer, best known internationally for her participation in the 1968 Eurovision Song Contest.

Early career 
Lombard studied at INSAS, a college of film, theatre and television studies in Brussels. She learned to play piano and guitar, and began composing music.

Eurovision Song Contest 
In 1968, Lombard's song "Quand tu reviendras" ("When You Come Back") was chosen by jury voting from ten songs as the Belgian representative in the 13th Eurovision Song Contest, which took place on 6 April in London. "Quand tu reviendras" finished in joint seventh place (with Monaco and Yugoslavia) of 17 entries.

Lombard returned to Eurovision in 1973, albeit as a backing singer, for that year's Belgian entry "Baby, Baby" performed by Nicole & Hugo. Although this finished in last place in the voting, the song, and particularly the performance, has since assumed iconic status in the Eurovision fan community.

Later career 
Lombard moved to France in the 1970s. She co-wrote a successful musical called Attention – fragile, and had gone on to enjoy a successful career as a musical voiceover artist in film and television, with many credits to her name. Films and shows she had worked on include Beauty and the Beast, The Prince of Egypt and Fraggle Rock. She also sang the French version of the Ai no Wakakusa Monogatari theme song in 1988, entitled Les quatre filles du docteur March.

References

External links
 
 

1945 births
2021 deaths
Eurovision Song Contest entrants for Belgium
20th-century Belgian women singers
20th-century Belgian singers
Eurovision Song Contest entrants of 1968
Musicians from Brussels